Elchin Mustafayev (born 5 July 2000) is an Azerbaijani footballer who plays as a defender for Shamakhi FK in the Azerbaijan Premier League.

Club career
On 22 January 2021, Mustafayev made his debut in the Azerbaijan Premier League for Shamakhi FK match against Sumgayit.

References

External links
 

2000 births
Living people
Association football defenders
Azerbaijani footballers
Azerbaijan youth international footballers
Azerbaijan Premier League players
Sabah FC (Azerbaijan) players
Shamakhi FK players